Esteban Lozano Solana (born 10 March 2003) is a Mexican professional footballer who plays as a forward for Liga MX club América.

Club career
Born in Mexico City, Lozano made his professional debut for Liga MX club América on 16 December 2020 in the CONCACAF Champions League against Atlanta United. He came on as a substitute.

International career
Lozano was included in the under-20 roster that participated in the 2022 CONCACAF U-20 Championship, in which Mexico failed to qualify for the FIFA U-20 World Cup and Olympics.

Career statistics

Club

Honours
Mexico U20
Revelations Cup: 2022

Individual
CONCACAF U-20 Championship Best XI: 2022

References

2003 births
Living people
People from Puebla (city)
Association football defenders
Footballers from Puebla
Club América footballers
Mexico under-20 international footballers
Mexican footballers